North White Plains station is a commuter rail stop on the Metro-North Railroad's Harlem Line, located in the North White Plains neighborhood of White Plains, New York. It is the north terminal for most trains that run local to the south and, until 1984, was the northern limit of electrification.

History
North White Plains station was originally built in 1972 by the Penn Central Railroad as a replacement for the former New York Central Railroad-built Holland Avenue station, a low-level northbound-only side platform located near the south end of the current station. It contained both high-level and low-level platforms, until electrification was expanded north of the station. Once Penn Central was dissolved in 1976, Conrail took responsibility for commuter service, until the Metropolitan Transportation Authority officially established Metro-North Railroad in 1983, making the station and the line part of the new railroad.

With the extension of electrification in 1984 to Brewster North, this was no longer the northern limit of electrification on the Harlem Line.

On October 5, 2015, MTA opened a new five story parking garage for the station at the southeast corner of Bond Street and Haarlem Avenue.

Station layout
The station has two slightly offset high-level island platforms, each 12 cars long. Adjacent to the station is a yard/support facility for trains, one of two on the line (Southeast is the other).

References

External links
 

 Haarlem Avenue entrance from Google Maps Street View
 Metro North - North White Plains Station (Foursquare Images)

Metro-North Railroad stations in New York (state)
Railway stations in Westchester County, New York
Buildings and structures in White Plains, New York
Railway stations in the United States opened in 1972
Transportation in Westchester County, New York